The Oceania Race Walking Championships is an annual race walking competition not only for athletes representing countries from Oceania, organized by the Oceania Athletics Association (OAA). It was established in 2011 and has featured races for senior men and women (20 km), and for junior athletes (10 km). Until 2014, all events were held together with the Australian Race Walking Championships, and the senior 20 km events were part of the IAAF World Race Walking Challenge.

Editions

Results
Complete results can be found on the IAAF, the OAA, and the Athletics Australia webpages.  Results for the juniors can be found on the World Junior Athletics History site.

Men's Results

20 kilometres

Women's Results

20 kilometres

Junior (U-20) Boys' Results

10 kilometres

Junior (U-20) Girls' Results

10 kilometres

See also
IAAF World Race Walking Cup
Asian Race Walking Championships
European Race Walking Cup
Pan American Race Walking Cup
Central American Race Walking Championships
South American Race Walking Championships

References

Continental athletics championships
Racewalking competitions
Recurring sporting events established in 2011
Racewalking